Câmpeni may refer to several places in Romania:

Câmpeni, a town in Alba County
Câmpeni, a village in Pârjol Commune, Bacău County
Câmpeni, a village in Prăjeni Commune, Botoșani County
Câmpeni, a village in Amaru Commune, Buzău County
Câmpeni, a village in Pielești Commune, Dolj County

and to:

Alexanderfeld (formerly Alexandru cel Bun or Cîmpeni), a commune in Cahul district, Moldova

See also 
 Câmpia (disambiguation)
 Câmpulung (disambiguation)
 Câmpu River (disambiguation)
 Câmpu Mare (disambiguation)